Maxime Rioux (born October 29, 1959) known by his stage name Maxime De La Rochefoucauld is a Canadian musician and performance artist based in Montreal, Quebec.

Rioux is best known for his compositions produced on musical instruments that are homemade and often built specifically for a single live performance. Most instruments (usually string or percussion) of his Système Ki, as Rioux calls it, are not played directly by a musician. Instead they are mechanically linked to a woofer that is driven by an inaudible, extremely low frequency electrical signal. The signal, in the range of 1-10 Hz, is most often generated on a synthesizer and prerecorded, but may be played live or be generated from other electrical sources.

The name "Ki" refers to the Japanese translation of Qi, the notion of a vital energy that animates all things.

Rioux is the brother of French-Canadian stage and film actress Geneviève Rioux.

Discography

Albums
 Automates Ki, Plastique Records, 1997 
 Collection Somnambule, Disques Pout Pout, 2002 
 Orchestraki, Storyboard Records, 2006

References

External links
Maxime Rioux's YouTube channel

Article in British music magazine The Wire
References to several online articles about Maxime De La Rochefoucald

1959 births
Living people
Musicians from Montreal
Canadian experimental musicians